In general topology and number theory, branches of mathematics, one can define various topologies on the set  of integers or the set  of positive integers by taking as a base a suitable collection of arithmetic progressions, sequences of the form  or   The open sets will then be unions of arithmetic progressions in the collection. Precise definitions are given below.

Hillel Furstenberg introduced the first topology in order to provide a "topological" proof of the infinitude of the set of primes. The second topology was studied by Solomon Golomb and provides an example of a countably infinite Hausdorff space that is connected.  The third topology, introduced by A.M. Kirch, is an example of a countably infinite Hausdorff space that is both connected and locally connected.  These topologies also have interesting separation and homogeneity properties.

The notion of an arithmetic progression topology can be generalized to arbitrary Dedekind domains.

Construction 

 
where  and   The intersection of two such arithmetic progressions is either empty, or is another arithmetic progression of the same form:
 

 
The intersection of two such arithmetic progressions is either empty, or is another arithmetic progression of the same form:
 
with  equal to the smallest element in the intersection.

This shows that every nonempty intersection of a finite number of arithmetic progressions is again an arithmetic progression. In general, it will be a subbase for the topology, and the set of all arithmetic progressions that are nonempty finite intersections of elements of  will be a base for the topology. Three special cases follow.

Equivalently, the subcollection of such sets with the extra condition  also forms a base for the topology. The corresponding topological space is called the Golomb space.

A base for the topology consists of all  with relatively prime  and  squarefree (or the same with the additional condition ). The corresponding topological space is called the Kirch space.

The three topologies are related in the sense that every open set in the Kirch topology is open in the Golomb topology, and every open set in the Golomb topology is open in the Furstenberg topology (restricted to the subspace ).  On the set , the Kirch topology is coarser than the Golomb topology, which is itself coarser that the Furstenberg topology.

Properties 

The Golomb topology and the Kirch topology are Hausdorff, but not regular.

The Furstenberg topology is Hausdorff and regular.  It is metrizable, but not completely metrizable.  Indeed, it is homeomorphic to the rational numbers  with the subspace topology inherited from the real line.  Broughan has shown that the Furstenberg topology is closely related to the -adic completion of the rational numbers.  

Regarding connectedness properties, the Furstenberg topology is totally disconnected.  The Golomb topology is connected, but not locally connected.  The Kirch topology is both connected and locally connected.

By contrast, the Golomb space and the Kirch space are topologically rigid — the only self-homeomorphism is the trivial one.

Relation to the infinitude of primes 

Both the Furstenberg and Golomb topologies furnish a proof that there are infinitely many prime numbers.  A sketch of the proof runs as follows:

 Fix a prime  and note that the (positive, in the Golomb space case) integers are a union of finitely many residue classes modulo .  Each residue class is an arithmetic progression, and thus clopen.  
 Consider the multiples of each prime.  These multiples are a residue class (so closed), and the union of these sets is all (Golomb: positive) integers except the units .  
 If there are finitely many primes, that union is a closed set, and so its complement (}) is open.  
 But every nonempty open set is infinite, so } is not open.

Generalizations 
The Furstenberg topology is a special case of the profinite topology on a group. In detail, it is the topology induced by the inclusion , where  is the profinite integer ring with its profinite topology.

The notion of an arithmetic progression makes sense in arbitrary -modules, but the construction of a topology on them relies on closure under intersection.  Instead, the correct generalization builds a topology out of ideals of a Dedekind domain.  This procedure produces a large number of countably infinite, Hausdorff, connected sets, but whether different Dedekind domains can produce homeomorphic topological spaces is a topic of current research.

Notes

References 

 .
 

Topological spaces
Arithmetic